Psychoshop is a science fiction novel begun by Alfred Bester, who died in 1987, and finished by Roger Zelazny. It was published posthumously in 1998 by Random House under their Vintage imprint, following Zelazny's death in 1995.

References

External links
  

1998 American novels
American science fiction novels
Novels by Roger Zelazny
Collaborative novels
Novels by Alfred Bester
Random House books
Novels published posthumously
1998 science fiction novels